The 1931 season was the second competitive season of São Paulo Futebol Clube. In this season, only one year after his debut São Paulo won his first official title with an impressive performance at the Campeonato Paulista with over 20 wins, Rubens Salles, a former player from Club Athletico Paulistano, became the first champion manager in the history of São Paulo FC, after a runners-up performance reached in previous year.

Overall

{|class="wikitable"
|-
|Games played || 31 (26 Campeonato Paulista, 5 Friendly match)
|-
|Games won ||  22 (20 Campeonato Paulista, 2 Friendly match)
|-
|Games drawn ||  7 (5 Campeonato Paulista, 2 Friendly match)
|-
|Games lost ||  2 (1 Campeonato Paulista, 1 Friendly match)
|-
|Goals scored || 105
|-
|Goals conceded || 37
|-
|Goal difference || +68
|-
|Best result || 8–1 (H) v América - Campeonato Paulista - 1931.6.21  8–1 (A) v Juventus - Campeonato Paulista - 1931.11.22
|-
|Worst result || 2–3 (A) v Palestra Itália - Campeonato Paulista - 1931.5.1
|-
|Top scorer || 
|-

Friendlies

Esporte Clube Sírio Birthday Festival

APEA Festival

CA Brasil Festival

Official competitions

Campeonato Paulista

Record

External links
official website 

Association football clubs 1931 season
1931
1931 in Brazilian football